The 1927–28 Scottish Second Division was won by Ayr United who, along with second placed Third Lanark, were promoted to the First Division. Armadale finished bottom.

Table

References 

 Scottish Football Archive

Scottish Division Two seasons
2
Scot